Alphabear is a freemium Scrabble-style word game that was released by independent video game company Spry Fox in July 2015. It draws on creative elements of one of their older releases, the 2010 game Panda Poet. A sequel, Alphabear 2, was released in 2018. Alphabear was removed from the stores in 2019.

Gameplay
The premise of the game is making words from random letters on a grid for points, and scoring as many points as possible. Using tiles unlocks other tiles adjacent to them, however tiles not used for a number of turns decay into unusable stone blocks. Scoring well in levels unlocks progressively more valuable cube-shaped bears and further levels. Playing a round requires the use of a game currency called 'honey', which accrues slowly at a certain rate, limiting the number of games that can be played successively. A payment of US$4.99 unlocks unlimited 'honey'. A player can select up to three bears to help them get more points in a game. The more powerful bears 'nap' for up to several hours after use in a game. These bears can give bonuses for using individual letters or overall score bonuses. The individual puzzles are in regular or timed mode.

Reception

Evan Killham of GamesBeat gave the game a score of 85/100, citing many positives but conceding the requirement for the game to be continually connected to the internet a problem.

Alphabear was reviewed by the Australian Council on Children and the Media (ACCM), who found there were no features of concern to young children.

A feature of the game that became a fad on Twitter was capturing screenshots of the bears incorporating words that had been entered by the player in random sentences.

Alphabear received the award for Standout Indie app at the inaugural Google Play Awards in 2016.

References

External links

2015 video games
IOS games
MacOS games
Windows games
Video games about bears
Video games developed in the United States
Android (operating system) games
Spry Fox games